Ah, Sweet Mouse-Story of Life is a 1965 Tom & Jerry cartoon directed and produced by Chuck Jones. The cartoon's title is a play-on-words of the song "Ah, Sweet Mystery of Life" from Naughty Marietta, though the storyline bears no resemblance.

Plot
The episode begins with Tom in pursuit of Jerry similar to that of race-car shifting gears, showing Tom's tail shifting like the gearshift of a 4-speed manual transmission. They circle the room and back to Jerry's mouse hole. Tom is moving so fast, he runs into the wall and turns into a four-legged stool. Tom attempts to cut off a 4×4 area of the wall with Jerry's mouse hole in it to reach the mouse, but instead, the rest of the wall collapses on top of him.

Then 1 Jerry is being chased by Tom in another direction, and suddenly a 2nd Jerry zooms past. Tom gets confused as a 3rd, 4th, and 5th Jerry run by and then Tom stops. He is puzzled as a 6th, 7th, and 8th Jerry zoom past. Even the 9th Jerry passed onto him as he faces it. Angrily, Tom looks in the direction the other nine Jerries were running. A 10th Jerry comes from the other direction and pulls back Tom's eyelids.

Tom then chases Jerry outside into the air. Jerry breaks off before falling into space, but Tom fails. He sees the streets (approximately) 50 stories below and grabs onto the drapes again, which brings him back inside but wraps him up with the drapes. Tom and Jerry then both run into free-fall. Jerry grabs a question mark and catches a pipe. Tom grabs onto an exclamation point and then twists it into a hook shape when he sees Jerry safe, but too late—he slams into the ground shortly thereafter. As he fixes himself like a jack using his tail, Tom climbs a rain gutter, but falls and lands in a manhole and screams.

Jerry discovers an air horn, which Jerry sounds behind Tom on a ledge. Tom is left chattering on a nearby pole.

Next, Jerry attempts to retreat into a second rain gutter, but Tom lassos him using a fish hook and with a chuckle, gives Jerry a taste of his own medicine. To get revenge, as Tom is laughing, Jerry dreams up some knives and throws them at Tom. Tom runs to the side of the building and narrowly avoids all knives, causing Jerry do break into a fit of laughter. He suddenly notices Tom charging towards him and manages to retreat into the second gutter. Tom pursues Jerry and catches him before he notices that he is stuck in the downpipe, with his head and front legs at the bottom and his tail and hind legs at the top. Jerry suggests using the air horn to "scare" Tom's hind legs and tail down the pipe so Tom can be free. After this, the two shake hands, and Tom kisses Jerry. After kissing him a few times, he becomes enticed by the taste of the mouse, and the chase then recommences. As Tom chases Jerry around a corner, Tom's midsection is now several meters long and he makes train noises when the cartoon closes.

Crew
Story: Michael Maltese & Chuck Jones
Animation: Dick Thompson, Ben Washam, Ken Harris, Don Towsley, & Tom Ray.
Backgrounds: Robert Gribbroek
Vocal Effects: June Foray & Mel Blanc
In Charge of Production: Les Goldman
Co-Director: Maurice Noble
Music: Eugene Poddany
Produced and Directed by: Chuck Jones

External links

1965 films
1965 short films
1965 animated films
1960s animated short films
Tom and Jerry short films
Short films directed by Chuck Jones
Films directed by Maurice Noble
Films scored by Eugene Poddany
1965 comedy films
Animated films without speech
American comedy films
Metro-Goldwyn-Mayer short films
Metro-Goldwyn-Mayer animated short films
MGM Animation/Visual Arts short films
Films with screenplays by Michael Maltese
1960s American films